Ferdinand I (12 January 1751 – 4 January 1825) was the King of the Two Sicilies from 1816, after his restoration following victory in the Napoleonic Wars. Before that he had been, since 1759, Ferdinand IV of the Kingdom of Naples and Ferdinand III of the Kingdom of Sicily. He was also King of Gozo. He was deposed twice from the throne of Naples: once by the revolutionary Parthenopean Republic for six months in 1799 and again by Napoleon in 1805, before being restored in 1816.

Ferdinand was the third son of King Charles VII of Naples and V of Sicily by his wife, Maria Amalia of Saxony. On 10 August 1759, Charles succeeded his elder brother, Ferdinand VI, becoming King Charles III of Spain, but treaty provisions made him ineligible to hold all three crowns. On 6 October, he abdicated his Neapolitan and Sicilian titles in favour of his third son, because his eldest son Philip had been excluded from succession due to imbecility and his second son Charles was heir-apparent to the Spanish throne. Ferdinand was the founder of the cadet House of Bourbon-Two Sicilies.

Childhood
Ferdinand was born in Naples and grew up amidst many of the monuments erected there by his father which can be seen today; the Palaces of Portici, Caserta and Capodimonte.

Ferdinand was his parents' third son, his elder brother Charles was expected to inherit Naples and Sicily. When his father ascended the Spanish throne in 1759 he abdicated Naples in  Ferdinand's favour in accordance with the treaties forbidding the union of the two crowns. A regency council presided over by the Tuscan Bernardo Tanucci was set up. The latter, an able, ambitious man, wishing to keep the government as much as possible in his own hands, purposely neglected the young king's education, and encouraged him in his love of pleasure, his idleness and his excessive devotion to outdoor sports.

Reign

Ferdinand's minority/childhood ended in 1767, and his first act was the expulsion of the Jesuits. The following year he married Archduchess Maria Carolina, daughter of Empress Maria Theresa. By the marriage contract the queen was to have a voice in the council of state after the birth of her first son, and she was not slow to avail herself of this means of political influence.

Tanucci, who attempted to thwart her, was dismissed in 1777. The Englishman Sir John Acton, who in 1779 was appointed director of marine, won Maria Carolina's favour by supporting her scheme to free Naples from Spanish influence, securing rapprochement with Austria and Great Britain. He became practically and afterward actually prime minister. Although not a mere grasping adventurer, he was largely responsible for reducing the internal administration of the country to a system of espionage, corruption and cruelty.

French Occupation and the Parthenopaean Republic
Although peace was made with France in 1796, the demands of the French Directory, whose troops occupied Rome, alarmed the king once more, and at his wife's instigation he took advantage of Napoleon's absence in Egypt and of Nelson's victories to go to war. He marched with his army against the French and entered Rome (29 November), but on the defeat of some of his columns he hurried back to Naples, and on the approach of the French, fled on 23 December 1798 aboard Nelson's ship  to Palermo, Sicily, leaving his capital in a state of anarchy.

The French entered the city in spite of the fierce resistance of the lazzaroni, and with the aid of the nobles and bourgeoisie established the Parthenopaean Republic (January 1799). When, a few weeks later the French troops were recalled to northern Italy, Ferdinand sent a hastily assembled force, under Cardinal Ruffo, to reconquer the mainland kingdom. Ruffo, with the support of British artillery, the Church, and the pro-Bourbon aristocracy, succeeded, reaching Naples in May 1800, and the Parthenopaean Republic collapsed. After some months King Ferdinand returned to the throne.

The king, and above all the queen, were particularly anxious that no mercy should be shown to the rebels, and Maria Carolina (a sister of the executed Marie Antoinette) made use of Lady Hamilton, Nelson's mistress, to induce Nelson to carry out her vengeance.

Third Coalition
The king returned to Naples soon afterwards, and ordered a few hundred who had collaborated with the French executed. This stopped only when the French successes forced him to agree to a treaty which included amnesty for members of the French party. When war broke out between France and Austria in 1805, Ferdinand signed a treaty of neutrality with the former, but a few days later he allied himself with Austria and allowed an Anglo-Russian force to land at Naples (see Third Coalition).

The French victory at the Battle of Austerlitz on 2 December enabled Napoleon to dispatch an army to southern Italy. Ferdinand fled to Palermo (23 January 1806), followed soon after by his wife and son, and on 14 February 1806 the French again entered Naples. Napoleon declared that the Bourbon dynasty had forfeited the crown, and proclaimed his brother Joseph King of Naples and Sicily. But Ferdinand continued to reign over the latter kingdom (becoming the first King of Sicily in centuries to actually reside there) under British protection.

Parliamentary institutions of a feudal type had long existed in the island, and Lord William Bentinck, the British minister, insisted on a reform of the constitution on English and French lines. The king indeed practically abdicated his power, appointing his son Francis as regent, and the queen, at Bentinck's insistence, was exiled to Austria, where she died in 1814.

Restoration
After the fall of Napoleon, Joachim Murat, who had succeeded Joseph Bonaparte as king of Naples in 1808, was dethroned in the Neapolitan War, and Ferdinand returned to Naples. By a secret treaty he had bound himself not to advance further in a constitutional direction than Austria should at any time approve; but, though on the whole he acted in accordance with Metternich's policy of preserving the status quo, and maintained with but slight change Murat's laws and administrative system, he took advantage of the situation to abolish the Sicilian constitution, in violation of his oath, and to proclaim the union of the two states into the kingdom of the Two Sicilies (12 December 1816).

Ferdinand was now completely subservient to Austria, an Austrian, Count Nugent, being even made commander-in-chief of the army. For the next four years he reigned as an absolute monarch within his domain, granting no constitutional reforms.

1820 revolution

The suppression of liberal opinion caused an alarming spread of the influence and activity of the secret society of the Carbonari, which in time affected a large part of the army. In July 1820 a military revolt broke out under General Guglielmo Pepe, and Ferdinand was terrorised into signing a constitution on the model of the Spanish Constitution of 1812. On the other hand, a revolt in Sicily, in favour of the recovery of its independence, was suppressed by Neapolitan troops.

The success of the military revolution at Naples seriously alarmed the powers of the Holy Alliance, who feared that it might spread to other Italian states and so lead to a general European conflagration. The Troppau Protocol of 1820 was signed by Austria, Prussia and Russia, although an invitation to Ferdinand to attend the adjourned Congress of Laibach (1821) was issued at which he failed to distinguish himself. He had twice sworn to maintain the new constitution but was hardly out of Naples before he repudiated his oaths and, in letters addressed to all the sovereigns of Europe, declared his acts to have been null and void. Metternich had no difficulty in persuading the king to allow an Austrian army to march into Naples "to restore order".

The Neapolitans, commanded by General Pepe, made no attempt to defend the difficult defiles of the Abruzzi, and were defeated at Rieti (7 March 1821). The Austrians entered Naples.

Later years
Following the Austrian victory, the Parliament was dismissed and Ferdinand suppressed the Liberals and Carbonari. The victory was used by Austria to force its grasp over Naples' domestic and foreign policies. Count Charles-Louis de Ficquelmont was appointed as the Austrian ambassador to Naples, practically administrating the country as well as managing the occupation and strengthening Austrian influence over Neapolitan elites.

Ferdinand died in Naples in January 1825. He was the last surviving child of Charles III.

Ferdinand I in cinema
That Hamilton Woman (1941) directed by Alexander Korda, played by Luis Alberni
Ferdinando and Carolina (1999) directed by Lina Wertmüller, played by Sergio Assisi, Adriano Pantaleo, and Mario Scaccia at different ages
 Luisa Sanfelice (2004) directed by Paolo and Vittorio Taviani, played by Emilio Solfrizzi

Issue

Ancestry

Heraldry

References

|-

|-

|-

|-

|-

Monarchs of the Kingdom of the Two Sicilies
1751 births
1825 deaths
18th-century Kings of Sicily
19th-century Kings of Sicily
18th-century monarchs of Naples
19th-century monarchs of Naples
House of Bourbon-Two Sicilies
Modern child monarchs
Knights of the Golden Fleece of Spain
Spanish infantes
Grand Crosses of the Order of Saint Stephen of Hungary
Burials at the Basilica of Santa Chiara